The 1958–59 Hellenic Football League season was the sixth in the history of the Hellenic Football League, a football competition in England.

Premier Division

The Premier Division featured 14 clubs which competed in the division last season, along with two new clubs:
Hungerford Town
Yiewsley reserves

League table

Division One

The Division One featured 11 clubs which competed in the division last season, along with 2 new clubs:
Abingdon United
Bletchley Town Reserves

League table

References

External links
 Hellenic Football League

1958-59
H